Leisure International Airways was a British charter airline which was established in 1987 and commenced operations in 1993. The company ceased operations in 1999.

History

The airline was established in October 1988 as Air UK Leisure, the charter branch of AirUK, and flying with Boeing 737-200 planes. The first flight of AirUK Leisure was from London to Faro. Later in October 1989, the 737-200 was retired and replaced by 737-400. In 1993, two Boeing 767-300 wide-body planes were leased to Unijet. By the start of the 1990s, three Airbus A320s were ordered to replace the 737-400. Later in 1996, Air UK Leisure was sold to Unijet. The airline was renamed "Leisure International Airways" and moved its main base of operation to London Gatwick and Manchester. The same year, the A320 was delivered and the airline ordered three A321s that were delivered the next year. One Boeing 757 was sold to Canada 3000 in December. In 1998, Leisure International was bought by Air 2000 and the aircraft began flying with them.

Fleet
3x Airbus A320
3x Airbus A321
2x Boeing 767-300ER

See also
 List of defunct airlines of the United Kingdom

References

External links

Defunct airlines of the United Kingdom
Airlines established in 1996
Airlines disestablished in 1999